was a professional boxer from Tokyo, Japan. He became the WBA flyweight champion on October 22, 1970, defeating the reigning champion Berkrerk Chartvanchai in Tokyo and retained the championship for an impressive five title defenses.  He died in a car accident at 23, still holding his world title. He was trained by Isamu Kuwata.

Childhood and early career 
Ohba was born on October 21, 1949. Ohba's father was a factory worker and a compulsive gambler, causing him to know poverty from an early age. His father followed professional boxing as an avid fan which influenced Ohba's childhood aspirations and dreams.  By the time Ohba was in elementary school, he dreamt of becoming a world champion, and bringing himself and his family out of poverty.

After completing middle school, he took a job in a candy shop to help support his family and trained as a boxer in the evening. He joined the Teiken Boxing Gym in 1965.  Because Ohba weighed only about 105 pounds and barely stood five feet when he entered the gym, the trainers doubted that he would be successful as a professional boxer. He trained hard, putting on the seven pounds of muscle he needed to box within the flyweight range by the time he made his debut.  He later had trouble making the strict flyweight limit later in his career, and at nearly five feet six inches was somewhat tall for a flyweight.

Professional career 
Ohba made his professional debut on November 7, 1966, at the age of 17 against Kazuyoshi Watanabe in Tokyo. Between November 1966 and August 1968, he won all but one of his first eighteen bouts, with one draw. He fought all of these matches in his hometown of Tokyo.

On December 14, 1969, he defeated Bernabe Villacampo in a non-title fight by way of a ten-round Unanimous Decision on points in Tokyo. Villicampo was Flyweight Champion at the time, making Oba's clear win an important victory, as well as an upset.

Taking the WBA World Flyweight Title
He got his first world title shot on October 22, 1970, at Nichidi Auditorium, Nihon University, in Tokyo, against Berkrerk Chartvanchai, who was the WBA World flyweight champion. He won by TKO in the 13th round before a crowd of 7000, becoming the eighth Japanese boxer to capture a world title.  According to one source, the bout was postponed from its initial date when Chartvanchai took ill with a high fever. Chartvanchai was down three times before finally being called out for the full count. Enrique Jimenez refereed.  Oba finished off Chartvanchai  with a volley of punches to the head at 2:16 into the thirteenth round. Charvantchai had trouble making the weight limit, even after doing light exercise and taking a steam bath, which may have weakened him for the bout.  Oba gained a considerable lead in points throughout the match.  Chartvanchai was weakened both by a cut to his eye he received in the fourth round which gave him trouble and the efforts he took to make weight.

First four defenses of the WBA World Flyweight Title
On January 21, 1971, he defeated Swiss boxer Fritz Chervet in a non-title fight technical knockout at Korakuen Hall in Tokyo, Japan. The bout was ended after 1:31 into the eighth round.

Ohba made his first three WBA World Flyweight Championship defenses by 15-round decisions, and his 4th defense by 5th-round KO, all at Nihon University Stadium in Tokyo.  He also fought four non-title matches in between his defenses, winning all of them as well.  His first defense was against the great champion Betulio González on April 1, 1971, in Tokyo in a very significant fifteen round Unanimous Decision. González would hold the Venezuelan Flyweight Title, and at one time hold both the WBC and WBA World Flyweight Championships.

On August 19, 1971, he won a Unanimous Decision over Tony Moreno of San Antonio in a non-title ten round bout. The audience of 2000 were somewhat disappointed as Ohba was unable to score a knockdown against his opponent.

His second defense of the World Flyweight Title was also a fifteen-round Unanimous Decision on October 23, 1971, against Filipino boxer Fernando Cabanela. His third defense was against Japanese boxer Susumu Hanagata on March 4, 1972, in a fifteen-round mixed decision in Tokyo. Hanagata, an accomplished flyweight, would briefly take the WBA World Flyweight Title in October 1974.

His fourth WBA World Flyweight defense was against Orlando "Yango" Amores from Colón, Republic of Panamá, on June 20, 1972, in Tokyo. Ohba impressively won on a fifth-round knockout.

Last fight, fifth defense of WBA World Flyweight Title
On January 2, 1973, Ohba faced the Thai veteran boxer, Chartchai Chionoi, for his fourth defense. Ohba was knocked down with a right hook in only forty seconds into the first round, and injured his right ankle while falling to the canvas. He managed to pick himself up, and his corner iced his ankle in between rounds, but Ohba limped as he exchanged punches with Chionoi.

Even with his injury, Ohba managed to overpower Chionoi in the middle rounds, often using rights to the head, and finally knocked down the challenger for the first time a 2:19 into the 12th round.  Chionoi was knocked down two more times in the round, and having been knocked down three times, the bout was ruled an automatic knockout. Ohba marked a dramatic 12th-round KO win for his 5th WBA World Flyweight Title defense.

He remarked to an interviewer after the bout that "I did not expect the Thai to put up such a good fight, it was my hardest fight so far."  He also noted "I did not expect the long hook that hit me first and made me groggy", and  "I did not expect the second that dropped me on my pants."

Premature death in car accident 
On the morning of January 25, 1973, only three weeks after his last defense, Ohba died in a car accident. He was returning to the Teiken Gym where he both trained and lived. Ohba was driving his new 1973 ivory Chevrolet Corvette down an expressway in Tokyo, when he hit a heavy duty eleven ton parked truck on the shoulder of the opposite lane. His Corvette had jumped the road divider when he was unable to negotiate a turn and he was unable to regain control.  He was driving around 60, in a 36-mile per hour zone and was an inexperienced driver, having only obtained his driver's license three months before the crash. He was only 23 years old, and still in possession of the WBA title.  As a dutiful son, he had just bought his parents a new home. On February 5, 1973, a funeral service was held by the World Boxing Association at Korakuen Hall in Tokyo, where he had once boxed. A separate service had been held at his home in Kasuwbe, twenty miles north of Tokyo.

Ohba was dubbed "The Eternal Champion," because he was undefeated in world title bouts and died while still reigning champion. He had been planning on relinquishing his flyweight title to challenge for the bantamweight title before his death. His professional record was 35-2-1 (16KOs).

Achievements and honors

Ohba was part of the 2015 class of the International Boxing Hall of Fame.

Professional boxing record

See also 
List of WBA world champions
List of Japanese boxing world champions
Boxing in Japan

References

External links
 
 International Boxing Hall of Fame Bio for Masao Ohba

1949 births
1973 deaths
Flyweight boxers
World Boxing Association champions
World boxing champions
Japanese male boxers
Sportspeople from Tokyo
Road incident deaths in Japan
International Boxing Hall of Fame inductees